Chiavari may refer to:
 Chiavari, Italy, town and comune on the Italian Riviera in the Province of Genoa, region of Liguria
 Chiavari railway station
 Roman Catholic Diocese of Chiavari
 Coti-Chiavari, commune in Corsica, France
 Chiavari chair, wooden chair originating in the Ligurian town